Nighte Pickering (born January 26, 2005) is an American soccer player who plays as a forward for Memphis 901 in the USL Championship.

Career

Youth career 
Pickering was born in Birmingham, Alabama, he joined the FC Dallas academy in 2017, where he stayed for five years. At Dallas, Pickering was a part of the under-15 team that won the 2019 FC Bayern adidas Campus Cup in Munich, Germany and won the Dallas Cup in 2017.

Professional career
On August 4, 2022, Pickering signed his a professional multi-year contract with USL Championship side Memphis 901. He scored his first professional goal on his debut in a 3–1 win over Hartford Athletic on August 6, 2022.

References

External links 
 Nighte Pickering Player Profile

2005 births
Living people
American soccer players
Association football forwards
Memphis 901 FC players
Soccer players from Alabama
Sportspeople from Birmingham, Alabama
United States men's youth international soccer players
USL Championship players